Deudorix edwardsi is a butterfly in the family Lycaenidae. It is found in the Rwenzori Mountains of Uganda and the Democratic Republic of the Congo.

References

Butterflies described in 1939
Deudorigini
Deudorix